Olaf Lindenbergh (born 6 February 1974) is a Dutch former professional footballer who played as a defender.

Club career
Lindenbergh was born in Purmerend. After playing in the youth level at ZOB, Ajax and De Graafschap, he began his professional career at De Graafschap that played in the Eerste Divisie. His debut was on 12 November 1994 in a 1–0 win over VVV. He became a key player for the team straight away and helped them to gain promotion to the Eredivisie for the following season, in which he made 30 appearances. In total he took part in 159 games for De Graafschap, scoring six goals, with the club permanently in the top flight. During the 1999–2000 season, he left De Vijverberg to continue his career at AZ Alkmaar.

At AZ, Lindenbergh was a first team regular from the start, but he struggled to gain appearances in his second season at the club. As of 2001 he was back on track and became one of the key players of the team unexpectedly made it to the UEFA Cup semi-finals in 2005, only to be beaten on away goals by Sporting Lisbon. Ajax manager Danny Blind acknowledged Lindenbergh's good form and declared an interest in signing him. At the end of the 2004–05 season, Lindenbergh agreed to a move to the Amsterdam ArenA.

He made his debut for the club in 2005 in the 2–0 Eredivisie victory against Willem II. He went on to play eighteen games that season, as well as gaining some Champions League experience along the way. Ajax went on to win the KNVB Cup that same season. When Blind left Ajax and Henk ten Cate was appointed as the new manager, times changed for Lindenbergh and he only appeared in 12 matches that season. Still he participated in the KNVB Cup, which Ajax successfully defended. Following speculation about a transfer (Lindenbergh, along with Michael Krohn-Dehli were deemed surplus to requirements, and were not even allowed to train with the first team to keep their fitness up), Lindenbergh signed with Sparta Rotterdam.

International career
While at De Graafschap, Lindenbergh was called up into the Netherlands under-21 national team squad.

Personal life
Lindenbergh joined amateur club ASV De Dijk of the Vierde Klasse in 2012.

References

 Voetbal International website and 2007/2008 presentation magazine

External links
 Player profile – Sparta Rotterdam
 Career stats – Voetbal International 
 Player profile – Ajax 
 Voetbal International profile
 Lindenbergh Sky Sports Profile & Latest News
 Lindenbergh Yahoo Profile
 
 Lindenbergh Eurosport Profile

1974 births
Living people
People from Purmerend
Dutch footballers
Association football defenders
Eredivisie players
Eerste Divisie players
De Graafschap players
AZ Alkmaar players
AFC Ajax players
Sparta Rotterdam players
AGOVV Apeldoorn players
FC Volendam players
ASV De Dijk players
Footballers from North Holland